West Ryder is an EP by rock band Kasabian and was released exclusively in the June 2009 issue of the German music magazine Musikexpress.  A follow-up EP to Fast Fuse, this EP was another promotion for their third studio album, West Ryder Pauper Lunatic Asylum.

Track listing
 "Underdog" (radio edit) – 3:53
 "Fire" – 4:10
 "Vlad the Impaler" – 4:54
 "Black Whistler" – 3:41
 "Me Plus One" (Jacques Lu Cont mix) – 8:33

References

2009 EPs
Kasabian albums